Seokjeong Literary Museum is a memorial hall built in Buan in 2011 to honor Shin Seok Jeong's literary spirit. Shin Seok-jeong, who was born in Buan, was an idyllic and participating poet. Seokjeong Literary Museum exhibits a collection of his poems and autograph manuscripts. It consists of a permanent exhibition hall and a planning exhibition hall. Si-nangsong (Poetry recitation) contest and essay contest are held annually here.

See also
Park Mok-wol

References

External links
  

Literary museums in South Korea
Buan County